The Szeged Symphony Orchestra (Szegedi Szimfonikus Zenekar) is an orchestra based in Szeged, Hungary.

History
The Szeged Symphony Orchestra was founded in 1969 by Viktor Vaszy, and is active both in the concert hall and for operatic performances in Szeged.

Since 2012 it has been titled Hungarian National Symphony Orchestra Szeged.

Principal conductors
1969−1975 Viktor Vaszy
1975−83 Tamás Pál
1983−89 Géza Oberfrank
1989−91 Tamás Pál
1991−99 Ervin Acél
1999−2008, 2018− Sándor Gyüdi

Managing directors
2008−2013 Gábor Baross 
2013−2018 Győző Lukácsházi

Music directors
1999−2004 Ervin Lukács
2004−2007 János Fürst
2008−2018 Sándor Gyüdi

Guest conductors have included Karl Richter, Alexander Frey, Lamberto Gardelli, Carlo Zecchi, Roberto Benzi, Libor Pešek, Zoltán Kocsis, Tamás Vásáry and Günter Neuhold.

The orchestra has toured to Europe, Taiwan, Singapore, China and Brazil, and has made records for Hungaroton (Liszt, Madarász). Other records include Dvorák Violin & Cello Concertos (Gramola), Kabalevsky Symphonies (Olympia), Liszt piano concertos (Aurophon), Dohnányi (DBE/CD), Mozart piano concertos (Duchesne World Records), Ravel, Roussel, Ives, Debussy and Bartók (AEM).

References 

Hungarian orchestras
Musical groups established in 1969